Whitecraigs railway station is a railway station serving the Whitecraigs and Davieland areas of the towns of Giffnock and Newton Mearns, East Renfrewshire, Greater Glasgow, Scotland.
The line here forms the boundary which separates Newton Mearns and Giffnock across Ayr Road.

History 
The station was originally opened as part of the Lanarkshire and Ayrshire Railway on 1 May 1903. In some timetables the station was known as Whitecraigs for Rouken Glen. The station building is listed Category C and is notable for its Arts and Crafts decorative detailing.

Facilities
The station has a ticket office, which is staffed part-time (06.55 - 13.55, Mondays to Saturdays only).  A ticket machine is also provided and there is a waiting room in the main building. Digital departure screens and a P.A system provide train running information.  Step-free access to both platforms is via ramps from the street and station car park, though the footbridge between the platforms has steps.

Services

Since electrification in 1962 
Since the line was electrified in 1962 the basic service has been a half-hour service throughout the day (Mondays to Saturdays), with additional peak hour trains (Mondays to Fridays). From 2005 a half-hourly Sunday service has also been provided.

Class 303 "Blue Train" electric multiple units provided almost all trains services for many years thereafter, being joined by the similar Class 311 from 1967. Services are now mainly operated by the Class 380 EMUs.

References

Notes

Sources 

 
 
 

Railway stations in East Renfrewshire
Former Caledonian Railway stations
Railway stations in Great Britain opened in 1903
Railway stations served by ScotRail
Listed railway stations in Scotland
Category C listed buildings in East Renfrewshire
Giffnock
Newton Mearns